Amelia Rahayu Murray, better known under her stage name Fazerdaze, is a New Zealand singer, songwriter, producer, and multi-instrumentalist.

She released her debut self-titled EP in October 2014, recording it entirely in her bedroom studio in Auckland. With the help of multi-instrumentalist Jonathan Pearce, who mastered the release, she created a dream-pop sound, using electric guitars and effect pedals.

Early years
Murray was born in New Zealand's capital city, Wellington, to an English-born New Zealander father and an Indonesian mother. She attended Onslow College, later moving to the city of Auckland.

History
Fazerdaze released her self-titled debut EP in 2014. In 2017, Murray released her first full-length album as Fazerdaze, called Morningside. Morningside was a surprise hit, with the song "Lucky Girl" in particular being a success. The song's music video, which was shot on film with a 16mm Bolex and edited by Murray herself, got over 20 million views on YouTube. Murray suffered burnout after the success of Morningside, and encountered problems in her personal life as well. She took a five-year hiatus from music, and returned with another EP, Break! in late 2022. Murray said: "I can hear my intuition and write songs and be creative; I signed a record deal, I moved into my own place. It’s like the floodgates opened for good stuff coming into my life." Musically, Break! is quite different from her previous work, with raw elements of dance pop and electronica. Inspiration was drawn from 90s bands like Blur and Nirvana.

Band Members
The Fazerdaze live band consists of Dave Rowlands (Guitar), Kat Tomacruz (Bass), Ollie O'Loughlin (Drums), Indira Force (Keys)

Discography
Studio albums
Morningside (2017, Flying Nun)

EPs
Fazerdaze (2014, self-released)
Break! (2022, section1) – No. 24 New Zealand

Singles
"Little Uneasy" (2015, self-released)
"Lucky Girl" (2017, self-released)
"Take It Slow" (2017, self-released)
"Come Apart" (2022, section1)
"Break!" (2022, section1)

References

External links 
 
 Flying Nun Records - Fazerdaze

Dream pop musicians
Grönland Records artists
Flying Nun Records artists
Living people
Musicians from Auckland
New Zealand people of Indonesian descent
New Zealand women musicians
1993 births